Frederick Gillespie (born June 14, 1997) is an American professional basketball player for Bayern Munich of the Basketball Bundesliga and the EuroLeague. He played college basketball for the Carleton Knights and the Baylor Bears.

Early life and high school career
Gillespie grew up in Saint Paul, Minnesota and played football growing up until trying basketball in eighth grade. He entered East Ridge High School at 5'11" and did not play basketball his freshman year, after breaking his ankle on the first day of team tryouts. He grew to 6'4" by the time he was a sophomore, and subsequently played on the junior varsity team. Gillespie played varsity ball as a junior but tore his ACL late in the season, causing him to miss the summer AAU circuit. He finally returned to the court healthy in his senior season, although Gillespie did not receive any all-conference honors. After receiving no Division I or II scholarship offers, Gillespie opted to attend Division III Carleton College.

College career
Gillespie started his collegiate career at Division III Carleton College, choosing the school due to its academic pedigree. He played only 16 total minutes in his true freshman season despite being, in his words, “the most athletic, biggest guy in that whole conference." As a sophomore, Gillespie averaged 10.0 points, 8.3 rebounds and 2.6 blocks per game, shooting 53.2 percent from the field. He was named second-team All-Minnesota Intercollegiate Athletic Conference. Following the season, he decided to attempt to transfer to a Division I program. A friend of Gillespie's mother, former Minnesota player and assistant coach Al Nuness, was able to put him in contact with Baylor coach Scott Drew through his son, Jared Nuness, a member of the Baylor coaching staff.

Gillespie joined the Baylor basketball team as a walk-on, sitting out a year due to NCAA transfer rules and then earning a scholarship. As a redshirt junior, he averaged 5.3 points and 4.4 rebounds per game in 26 games played. On December 9, 2019, Gillespie was named Big 12 Player of the Week after contributing 17 points, 13 rebounds, and five blocks in a win over Arizona. At the conclusion of the regular season, Gillespie was named Big 12 Most Improved Player, Second Team All-Big 12 and to the All-Defensive Team after averaging 9.6 points, 9.0 rebounds and 2.2 blocks per game.

Professional career

Memphis Hustle (2021)
After going undrafted in the 2020 NBA draft, Gillespie signed a training camp contract with the Dallas Mavericks, but didn't make the final roster.  

On January 11, 2021, the Memphis Hustle selected Gillespie with the 2nd pick overall in the 2020–2021 NBA G League draft. In 15 games, he averaged 10.5 points, 10.3 rebounds and 2.3 blocks in 27.8 minutes while shooting .570 from the field and recording six double-doubles.

Toronto Raptors (2021)
On April 8, 2021, Gillespie signed a 10-day contract with the Toronto Raptors. Two days later, he made his debut with the Raptors, recording six points, four rebounds, one assist, three steals and one block in 18 minutes during a 135–115 win against the Cleveland Cavaliers. On April 14, in a 122–117 win over the San Antonio Spurs, he scored 9 points, grabbed 8 rebounds and recorded 2 blocks, all career-highs. Two days later, he reached a new career-high of 10 points, with seven rebounds, in a 113–102 win against the Orlando Magic. On April 18, Gillespie signed a second 10-day contract and tied his career-high with 10 points, two rebounds, one assist and one steal, going a perfect 4 of 4 from the field in a 112–106 win against the Oklahoma City Thunder. Three days later, he had four points, five rebounds, and a career-high five blocks in a 114–103 win against the Brooklyn Nets. On April 28, Gillespie signed for the remainder of the season. He was represented by sports agency Beyond Athlete Management. On May 2, 2021, Gillespie had a new career-high of 11 points, with seven rebounds and one steal, in a 121–114 win over the Los Angeles Lakers.

On October 13, 2021, Gillespie was waived by the Raptors.

Return to the Hustle (2021) 
On October 23, 2021, Gillespie re-signed with the Memphis Hustle. In 12 games, he averaged 11.4 points, 12.2 rebounds, 1.0 assists, 2.75 blocks and 1.17 steals in 33.2 minutes per game, leading the team in rebounding and leading the entire league in blocked shots.

Orlando Magic (2021–2022)
On December 21, 2021, Gillespie signed a 10-day contract with the Orlando Magic. He signed a second 10-day contract with the team on December 31.

Third stint with the Memphis Hustle (2022)
On January 10, 2022, Gillespie was reacquired and activated by the Memphis Hustle.

Bayern Munich (2022–present)
On July 25, 2022, he has signed with Bayern Munich of the Basketball Bundesliga.

Career statistics

NBA

Regular season

|-
| style="text-align:left;"|
| style="text-align:left;"|Toronto
| 20 || 2 || 19.6 || .524 ||  || .697 || 4.9 || .5 || .7 || 1.0 || 5.6
|-
| style="text-align:left;"|
| style="text-align:left;"|Orlando
| 9 || 2 || 13.2 || .409 || .000 || .429 || 4.0 || .6 || .3 || 1.0 || 2.3
|- class="sortbottom"
| style="text-align:center;" colspan="2"| Career
| 29 || 4 || 17.6 || .500 || .000 || .650 || 4.6 || .5 || .6 || 1.0 || 4.6

College

NCAA Division I

|-
| style="text-align:left;"| 2017–18
| style="text-align:left;"| Baylor
| style="text-align:center;" colspan="11"|  Redshirt
|-
| style="text-align:left;"| 2018–19
| style="text-align:left;"| Baylor
| 26 || 11 || 18.3 || .652 || – || .531 || 4.4 || .3 || .7 || 1.1 || 5.3
|-
| style="text-align:left;"| 2019–20
| style="text-align:left;"| Baylor
| 30 || 30 || 28.4 || .550 || – || .684 || 9.0 || .5 || 1.1 || 2.2 || 9.6
|- class="sortbottom"
| style="text-align:center;" colspan="2"| Career
| 56 || 41 || 23.7 || .582 || – || .646 || 6.9 || .4 || .9 || 1.7 || 7.6

NCAA Division III

|-
| style="text-align:left;"| 2015–16
| style="text-align:left;"| Carleton
| 4 || 0 || 4.0 || .500 || – || .250 || 1.8 || .3 || .3 || .5 || 1.0
|-
| style="text-align:left;"| 2016–17
| style="text-align:left;"| Carleton
| 27 || 23 || 22.8 || .532 || – || .583 || 8.3 || .8 || .6 || 2.6 || 10.0
|- class="sortbottom"
| style="text-align:center;" colspan="2"| Career
| 31 || 23 || 20.4 || .532 || – || .544 || 7.5 || .7 || .5 || 2.3 || 8.8

References

External links

Baylor Bears bio
RealGM bio

1997 births
Living people
American expatriate basketball people in Canada
American expatriate basketball people in Germany
American men's basketball players
Basketball players from Saint Paul, Minnesota
Baylor Bears men's basketball players
Carleton Knights men's basketball players
FC Bayern Munich basketball players
Memphis Hustle players
Orlando Magic players
Power forwards (basketball)
Toronto Raptors players
Undrafted National Basketball Association players